Elections to Newry and Mourne District Council were held on 18 May 1977 on the same day as the other Northern Irish local government elections. The election used six district electoral areas to elect a total of 30 councillors.

Election results

Note: "Votes" are the first preference votes.

Districts summary

|- class="unsortable" align="centre"
!rowspan=2 align="left"|Ward
! % 
!Cllrs
! % 
!Cllrs
! %
!Cllrs
! %
!Cllrs
! %
!Cllrs
!rowspan=2|TotalCllrs
|- class="unsortable" align="center"
!colspan=2 bgcolor="" | SDLP
!colspan=2 bgcolor="" | UUP
!colspan=2 bgcolor="" | Alliance
!colspan=2 bgcolor="" | DUP
!colspan=2 bgcolor="white"| Others
|-
|align="left"|Area A
|bgcolor="#99FF66"|33.2
|bgcolor="#99FF66"|2
|32.4
|2
|2.2
|0
|15.8
|1
|16.4
|0
|5
|-
|align="left"|Area B
|bgcolor="#99FF66"|50.0
|bgcolor="#99FF66"|2
|11.6
|0
|17.9
|1
|0.0
|0
|20.5
|1
|4
|-
|align="left"|Area C
|bgcolor="#99FF66"|48.2
|bgcolor="#99FF66"|2
|47.0
|2
|0.0
|0
|0.0
|0
|4.8
|0
|4
|-
|align="left"|Area D
|bgcolor="#99FF66"|44.2
|bgcolor="#99FF66"|3
|25.5
|2
|9.5
|1
|0.0
|0
|20.8
|1
|7
|-
|align="left"|Area E
|bgcolor="#99FF66"|61.1
|bgcolor="#99FF66"|4
|11.3
|0
|1.3
|0
|0.0
|0
|26.3
|2
|6
|-
|align="left"|Area F
|bgcolor="#99FF66"|47.7
|bgcolor="#99FF66"|2
|23.4
|1
|19.9
|1
|0.0
|0
|9.0
|0
|6
|- class="unsortable" class="sortbottom" style="background:#C9C9C9"
|align="left"| Total
|46.9
|15
|24.5
|7
|8.3
|3
|3.1
|1
|17.2
|4
|30
|-
|}

Districts results

Area A

1973: 3 x UUP, 2 x SDLP, 1 x Independent Nationalist
1977: 2 x UUP, 2 x SDLP, 1 x DUP
1973-1977 Change: SDLP and DUP gain from UUP and Independent Nationalist

Area B

1973: 2 x SDLP, 1 x Alliance, 1 x Independent Nationalist
1977: 2 x SDLP, 1 x Alliance, 1 x Independent Nationalist
1973-1977 Change: No change

Area C

1973: 2 x SDLP, 2 x Independent Unionist
1977: 2 x SDLP, 2 x UUP
1973-1977 Change: UUP (two seats) gain from Independent Unionist (two seats)

Area D

1973: 3 x SDLP, 2 x Independent Unionist, 1 x Alliance, 1 x Republican Clubs
1977: 3 x SDLP, 2 x UUP, 1 x Alliance, 1 x Independent Nationalist
1973-1977 Change: UUP (two seats) and Independent Nationalist gain from Independent Unionist (two seats) and Republican Clubs

Area E

1973: 3 x SDLP, 1 x Republican Clubs, 1 x Independent Republican, 1 x Independent Unionist
1977: 4 x SDLP, 1 x Independent Nationalist, 1 x Independent Republican
1973-1977 Change: SDLP (two seats) gain from Republican Clubs and Independent Unionist, Independent Nationalist leaves SDLP

Area F

1973: 2 x SDLP, 2 x Alliance
1977: 2 x SDLP, 1 x Alliance, 1 x UUP
1973-1977 Change: UUP gain from Alliance

References

Newry and Mourne District Council elections
Newry and Mourne